Hudson's Bay is a 1941 American adventure historical western film directed by Irving Pichel and starring Paul Muni and Gene Tierney. Produced by 20th Century Fox, the film is about a pair of French-Canadian explorers whose findings lead to the formation of the Hudson's Bay Company.

In Canada, the film was heavily promoted by the Hudson's Bay Company through its retail stores.

Plot
A trapper, Pierre Esprit Radisson, and his friend, nicknamed "Gooseberry," hope to open a trading post in the Hudson's Bay region of northeastern Canada in the year 1667.

They meet the jailed Lord Edward Crewe, a nobleman from England who has been banished from that country by King Charles II. They manage to free Edward, who funds their expedition, beginning in Montreal, designed to further free trade with the Indians and make Canada a more united land.

Barbara Hall is the sweetheart of Edward and her brother, Gerald, is thrust upon them after the explorers travel to England to seek the king's favor. Prince Rupert helps get Edward back in the king's good graces. Charles II is open to the idea of a trading post, provided he is personally brought 400,000 pelts.

Gerald creates trouble in Canada as soon as the new Fort Charles trading post is established. His actions incite violence among the Indian natives, who demand he be punished. Over the king's objections and to Barbara's horror, Radisson and his associates permit Gerald to be sentenced to death by a firing squad.

But once the gravity of her brother's misdeeds become clear to her, and with the flourishing of the Hudson's Bay trading post, Barbara forgives her love Edward while his partners Radisson and Gooseberry celebrate their success.

Cast
 Paul Muni as Pierre Esprit Radisson
 Gene Tierney as Barbara Hall
 Laird Cregar as Gooseberry
 John Sutton as Lord Edward Crewe  
 Virginia Field as Nell Gwyn
 Vincent Price as King Charles 
 Nigel Bruce as Prince Rupert
 Morton Lowry as Gerald Hall
 Robert Greig as Sir Robert
 Chief Thundercloud as Orimha  
 Frederick Worlock as English Governor 
 Florence Bates as Duchess 
 Montagu Love as Governor D'Argenson 
 Ian Wolfe as Mayor
 Chief John Big Tree as Chief
 Jody Gilbert as Germaine

Reception
George MacDonald Fraser wrote in 1988, "Hudson's Bay paid the penalty for being ahead of its time; critics found it boring, and one described it as 'a cock-eyed history lesson' which, overall, it certainly is not." MacDonald goes on to say of Vincent Price in the role of the King, "Here was an actor who looked reasonably like Old Rowley, and combined the languid style with the athletic presence - one could imagine Price walking ten miles a day for the fun of it as King Charles did."

Box office
The film earned a profit of $88,500.

References

External links
 
 
 

1941 films
1940s historical drama films
1941 adventure films
American adventure films
American Western (genre) films
1941 Western (genre) films
20th Century Fox films
American historical drama films
American black-and-white films
Films scored by Alfred Newman
Drama films based on actual events
Films directed by Irving Pichel
Films set in the 1660s
Films set in the 1670s
Films set in Canada
Films produced by Darryl F. Zanuck
Films with screenplays by Lamar Trotti
1941 drama films
Cultural depictions of Charles II of England
Hudson's Bay Company
Cultural depictions of Nell Gwyn
1940s English-language films
1940s American films